A table cell is one grouping within a chart table used for storing information or data. Cells are grouped horizontally (rows of cells) and vertically (columns of cells). Each cell contains information relating to the combination of the row and column headings it is collinear with. In software design, table cells are a key component in HTML and webpage building, and it is part of the <table> component. A coder may specify dimensions for a table cell, and use them to hold sections of webpages.

HTML usage

Kinds of cell in HTML
A table cell in HTML is a non-empty element and should always be closed. There are two different kinds of table cell in HTML: normal table cell and header cell. <td> denotes a table cell, the name implying 'data', while <th> denotes a table 'header'. The two can be used interchangeably, but it is recommended that header cell be only used for the top and side headers of a table.

Syntax
A table cell also must be nested within a <table> tag and a <tr> (table row) tag. If there are more table cell tags in any given row than in any other, the particular <tr> must be given a  attribute declaring how many columns of cells wide it should be.

Example
An example of an HTML table containing 4 cells:

HTML source:
<table border="1">
  <tr>
    <td>
      Cell 1
    </td>
    <td>
      Cell 2
    </td>
  </tr>
  <tr>
    <td>
      Cell 3
    </td>
    <td>
      Cell 4
    </td>
  </tr>
</table>

Colspan and rowspan
Every row must have the same number of table data cells, occasionally table data cells have to span more than one column or row. In this case the tags colspan and/or rowspan are used - where they are set to a number.

See also
Tables in Wikipedia pages
Table (HTML)

External links
TH and TD elements
DHTML Reference: td
TD Tag

HTML tags
HTML